Muhittin Kurtiş (1876; Damascus, Ottoman Empire - 1951; Istanbul, Turkey) was an officer of the Ottoman Army and the general of the Turkish Army.

See also
List of high-ranking commanders of the Turkish War of Independence

Sources

External links

1876 births
1951 deaths
People from Damascus
Ottoman Military Academy alumni
Ottoman Military College alumni
Ottoman Army officers
Syrian people of Turkish descent
Ottoman military personnel of the Italo-Turkish War
Ottoman military personnel of the Balkan Wars
Ottoman military personnel of World War I
Turkish military personnel of the Turkish War of Independence
Turkish military personnel of the Greco-Turkish War (1919–1922)
Turkish Army generals
Recipients of the Iron Cross (1914)
Recipients of the Medal of Independence with Red Ribbon (Turkey)